The Man with the Cannon is a 1977 Albanian film directed by Viktor Gjika based on the novel by the same title by Dritero Agolli.

Plot
Adaptation of the novel with the same title from Dritëro Agolli. Mato Gruda has been feuding with the old man Mere Fizi. Mato Gruda keeps a gun in a hidden place dreaming to use it against Fizies. He keeps an Italian as a helper at home, and calls him Agush. Agush became his teacher to use his war s tool. Hence, the secret of a peasant who joined the war out of necessity comes to light.

Cast
Timo Flloko as Mato Gruda
Elida Cangonji	as Zare
Stavri Shkurti	as Murat Shtaga	
Drita Pelingu	as Esmaja
Zef Bushati as The Italian
Kadri Roshi as Mere Fizi
Thimi Filipi	
Birçe Hasko	
Enea Xhegu

External links
 

Albanian drama films
Albanian-language films
1977 films
1977 drama films
1970s war films